Yersinia intermedia is a Gram-negative species of bacteria which uses rhamnose, melibiose, and raffinose. Its type strain is strain 3953 (=CIP 80-28 =ATCC 29909 =Bottone 48 =Chester 48). It has been found in fish, and contains several biotypes. It is not considered of clinical relevance, being isolated from humans in a routine manner.

References

Further reading

External links
LSPN lpsn.dsmz.de
Type strain of Yersinia intermedia at BacDive -  the Bacterial Diversity Metadatabase

intermedia
Bacteria described in 1980